1887 Virton, provisional designation , is a stony Eoan asteroid from the outer region of the asteroid belt, approximately 21 kilometers in diameter. It was discovered by Belgian astronomer Sylvain Arend at the Royal Observatory of Belgium in Uccle on 5 October 1950, and named after the Belgian town of Virton.

Orbit and classification 

Virton is a member of the Eos family. It orbits the Sun in the outer main-belt at a distance of 2.7–3.3 AU once every 5 years and 3 months (1,902 days). Its orbit has an eccentricity of 0.11 and an inclination of 10° with respect to the ecliptic.

The body's observation arc begins with its official discovery observation at Uccle, as previous observations at Johannesburg, Crimea-Simeis and Turku Observatory remained unused.

Physical characteristics 

The asteroid has been characterized as a common stony S-type asteroid.

Diameter and albedo 

According to the surveys carried out by the Japanese Akari satellite and NASA's Wide-field Infrared Survey Explorer with its subsequent NEOWISE mission, Virton measures between 20.8 and 23.43 kilometers in diameter and its surface has an albedo between 0.105 and 0.124, respectively. The Collaborative Asteroid Lightcurve Link assumes an albedo of 0.14 and calculates a diameter of 21.4 kilometers with an absolute magnitude of 11.1.

Lightcurves 

As of 2017, Virtons rotation period and shape remain unknown.

Naming 

This minor planet was named after the town and capital district, Virton, in the southernmost part Belgium. It is located very close to Robelmont, Arend's birthplace (also see 1145 Robelmonte). The official naming citation was published by the Minor Planet Center on 22 September 1983.

References

External links 
 Asteroid Lightcurve Database (LCDB), query form (info )
 Dictionary of Minor Planet Names, Google books
 Asteroids and comets rotation curves, CdR – Observatoire de Genève, Raoul Behrend
 Discovery Circumstances: Numbered Minor Planets (1)-(5000) – Minor Planet Center
 
 

 

001887
Discoveries by Sylvain Arend
Named minor planets
19501005